Legacy Arena (formerly known as the BJCC Coliseum and the BJCC Arena) is an arena located at the Birmingham–Jefferson Convention Complex in Birmingham, Alabama. The arena seats 17,654 for sporting events, 19,000 for concerts and 8,000 in a theater setting. When the arena is converted to theater seating, the arena serves under the name Magic City Theatre.

Arena information
The arena stands ten stories tall, but it actually measures only 75 feet (23 m) from floor to ceiling and contains an oval-shaped 24,200-square-foot (2,244.5 m²) (110' by 220' (33.5 x 67 m)) arena floor. The arena contains several luxury suites and a press box. The BJCC Arena Club is also located in the arena. It is a lounge that is limited to 500 guests and available for most arena events. Backstage there are 2 locker rooms and 6 dressing rooms as well as a press room and a VIP Reception area. The arena can accommodate 8 trucks backstage—3 on truck docks and room for 5 more. The arena's four-sided center-hung scoreboard, designed by Daktronics, measures 18' by 18' (5.5 x 5.5 m) on each side. Also on each side is a 7.5'-by-8'8" ProStar 16.5 mm video display.

History
The arena opened in 1976 as part of the Birmingham–Jefferson Convention Complex.

The arena was home of the Birmingham Bulls of the WHA from 1976 to 1979; when the WHA folded, a minor league team with the same name called the arena home through 2001. It was there in December 1977 that hockey legend Gordie Howe, then playing for the WHA's New England Whalers, scored his 1,000th career goal at the age of 49; his Whalers defeated the Bulls 6–3. The arena was also the home of the UAB men's basketball team before it moved into Bartow Arena in 1988 and was home to the Alabama Steeldogs arena football team of the af2 from 2000 to 2007.

On December 17, 2014 the Civic Center board and officials of Legacy Credit Union announced a five-year, $2 million naming rights contract. Beginning January 1, 2015 the arena was officially renamed as Legacy Arena at the BJCC.

On October 24, 2018, the New Orleans Pelicans and the NBA G League announced that the Pelicans have acquired the right to own and operate an NBA G League team in Birmingham, Alabama. The team was expected to begin play in Birmingham by the 2022–23 basketball season playing at Legacy Arena following renovations to the arena. In the interim, the team began play for the 2018–19 season in Erie, Pennsylvania, as the Erie BayHawks, while the arena underwent a $123 million expansion and renovation. The renovations were completed in time for the 2021–22 season and the Pelicans chose to move the franchise, now known as the Birmingham Squadron, at that time.

Notable events

Sports

Basketball

The arena has hosted four Southeastern Conference men's basketball tournaments between 1979 and 1992, five Sun Belt Conference men's basketball tournaments in 1982, 1983, 1984, 1986, 1990, and the Conference USA men's basketball tournament in 1999, 2015, and 2016 (along with Bartow Arena), as well as C-USA's 1996 and 2016 Women's Basketball Championship. It has also hosted the NCAA men's college basketball tournament serving as first and second round host in 1984, 1987, 2000, 2003, 2008, and 2023. The BJCC will host the Sweet Sixteen and Elite Eight for the 2025 NCAA women's college basketball tournament. The BJCC has been a regional site five times – 1982, 1985, 1988, 1995 and 1997 for the men's tournament.  It also serves as the host for the Alabama High School Athletic Association basketball state finals each year.

Tennis
In 2009, the arena hosted the first round tie of the 2009 Davis Cup between the United States and Switzerland. Several tennis stars participated including Andy Roddick, James Blake, Bob and Mike Bryan and Stanislas Wawrinka. The arena also hosted the 2017 Davis Cup on February 3–5, 2017.

See also
Birmingham–Jefferson Convention Complex

References

External links
Official website

Alabama Steeldogs
Basketball venues in Alabama
College basketball venues in the United States
Erie BayHawks (2019–2021)
Event venues established in 1976
Indoor ice hockey venues in Alabama
NBA G League venues
Sports venues in Birmingham, Alabama
Tennis venues in the United States
Tourist attractions in Birmingham, Alabama
UAB Blazers basketball venues
World Hockey Association venues
1976 establishments in Alabama
Indoor arenas in Alabama